Thongaree's disc-nosed bat (Eudiscoderma thongareeae) is a critically endangered species of bat found in Thailand. It is the only member of the genus Eudiscoderma.

It has been observed eating beetles. All known individuals have come Thailand in the Bala Forest of Narathiwat Province.

This species is currently evaluated as critically endangered by the IUCN. Only three individuals have ever been observed.

References

Mammals described in 2015
Bats of Southeast Asia
Megadermatidae